The Deer River is a  stream in eastern New Hampshire in the United States. It is a tributary of Silver Lake, part of the Ossipee Lake / Saco River watershed leading to the Atlantic Ocean.

The Deer River lies entirely within the town of Madison, New Hampshire. It begins at a wetland where Ham Brook and Salter Brook join, then flows south through woodlands to the village of Silver Lake, where it enters the north end of Silver Lake, the water body.

See also

List of rivers of New Hampshire

References

Rivers of New Hampshire
Rivers of Carroll County, New Hampshire